This is a list of heads of the Tuzla Canton.

Heads of the Tuzla Canton (1994–present)

Governors

Prime Ministers

External links
World Statesmen - Tuzla Canton

Tuzla Canton